Mandy Hering (born 11 March 1984) is a German handball player. She plays for the club Frankfurter HC and for the German national team.

She represented Germany at the 2008 Summer Olympic Games in Beijing, where the German team  placed 11th. She participates at the 2009 World Women's Handball Championship in China.

References

1984 births
Living people
German female handball players
Handball players at the 2008 Summer Olympics
Olympic handball players of Germany